Lohne is a river of Lower Saxony, Germany. It is an influent of the river Hunte that springs from lake Dümmer and flows into river Hunte in Diepholz after .

See also
List of rivers of Lower Saxony

References

Rivers of Lower Saxony
Rivers of Germany